Darkstalkers is a comic book series created by UDON Comics and based on the Darkstalkers video game franchise by Capcom.

Darkstalkers was originally published through Devil's Due Publishing, consisting of six issues (five including issue #0) in 2004-2005 that were later collected in a TPB collection, which omitted the backup stories presented at the end of each issue, and included a special Morrigan background story previously only seen in Capcom Summer Special (2004) comic book. In 2010, UDON revived the series in a three-issue miniseries entitled Darkstalkers: The Night Warriors. A compilation of both UDON series, Darkstalkers: The Ultimate Edition, was released in 2012. 

An eight-issue comic book crossover with the Street Fighter game series titled Street Fighter vs. Darkstalkers was published in nine monthly issues (including #0) in 2017–2018.

Reception 
While published by UDON, the Darkstalkers comics didn't get the same recognition and popularity as the Street Fighter comics, being pretty unpopular and forgotten over time. While the art style received praise by  people, the writing and changes to the narrative (like Morrigan Aensland's unfaithful and inaccurate portrayal) were very negatively received and criticized.

See also
Street Fighter UDON comics

References

External links
Darkstalkers at The Official UDON Entertainment Store

2004 comics debuts
Canadian comics titles
Comics based on video games
Darkstalkers
Devil's Due Publishing titles
Fantasy comics
Horror comics
Works based on Capcom video games